is a Japanese professional footballer who plays as a goalkeeper for Urawa Red Diamonds.

Club career
Nishikawa is a product of Oita's youth system and was promoted to the top team in 2005. He made his J1 League debut on 2 July 2005 for Oita Trinita in a match against Yokohama F. Marinos. He became a regular in the 2006 season. After the relegation of Oita Trinita Nishikawa signed on 30 December 2009 for J1 League club Sanfrecce Hiroshima. 

In 2014, Nishikawa transfer to Urawa Red Diamonds as permanently after contract expiration with Sanfrecce Hiroshima.

International career
Nishikawa was a member of the Japan U20 national team for the 2005 World Youth Championship finals. He played full time in all four matches. He was also a member of the Japan U23 national team at the 2008 Summer Olympics. He played full time in all three matches.

He made his full international debut for Japan on 8 October 2009 in a 2011 Asian Cup qualification against Hong Kong.

Career statistics

Club

.

International

Honours
Oita Trinita
 J.League Cup: 2008

Sanfrecce Hiroshima
J1 League: 2012
Japanese Super Cup: 2013

Urawa Red Diamonds
J. League Cup: 2016
Suruga Bank Championship: 2017
AFC Champions League: 2017
Emperor's Cup: 2018
Japanese Super Cup: 2022

Japan
AFC Asian Cup: 2011
Kirin Cup: 2011
EAFF East Asian Cup: 2013

Individual
J. League Best XI: 2012, 2016
AFC Champions League Player of the week: 2019 Semi-finals 2nd leg

References

External links

Profile at Urawa Reds 
Shusaku Nishikawa – Yahoo! Japan competition record 
Shusaku Nishikawa whoscored.com profile

1986 births
Living people
Association football people from Ōita Prefecture
Japanese footballers
Japan youth international footballers
Japan international footballers
J1 League players
Oita Trinita players
Sanfrecce Hiroshima players
Urawa Red Diamonds players
Olympic footballers of Japan
Footballers at the 2008 Summer Olympics
2011 AFC Asian Cup players
AFC Asian Cup-winning players
2013 FIFA Confederations Cup players
2014 FIFA World Cup players
2015 AFC Asian Cup players
Association football goalkeepers